The Warsaw–Gdańsk railway is a  Polish railway line, that connects Warsaw with Iława, Malbork,  Tczew, Gdańsk and further along the coast to Gdynia.

Opening
The line was opened in stages between 1852 and 1877. Today's Line 9 was created separately in the Russian zone and German zone. It was built as part of the Prussian Eastern Railway linking Berlin with Königsberg (today's Kaliningrad).

The line is double track throughout. The last single-track section between Mikolajki Pomorskie and Malbork was doubled to two tracks in 1967.

Electrification
Electrification took place in six stages between 1969 and 1985:

1969 - electrification of section Gdańsk - Tczew
1972 - electrification of section Warsaw - Nasielsk
1983-1985 - electrification of section of Nasielsk - Tczew

Modernisation
The cost of modernisation cost about PLN 10 billion, which gives an approximate cost of PLN 31 million per kilometer of the route.

Usage
The line sees trains of various categories (EuroCity, Express InterCity, Intercity, TLK and regional services).

EuroCity services from Gdynia to Vienna
Intercity Premium, Express Intercity, Intercity and TLK services along the whole route
Regional services

See also 
 Railway lines of Poland

References

 This article is based upon a translation of the Polish language version as of October 2016.

External links 

Railway lines in Poland
Railway lines opened in 1852